The 59th District of the Iowa House of Representatives in the state of Iowa.

Current elected officials
Bob Kressig is the representative currently representing the district.

Past representatives
The district has previously been represented by:
 Vernon N. Bennett, 1971–1973
 David Readinger, 1973–1977
 Lyle Krewson, 1977–1983
 Brian Carter, 1983–1987
 Clyde Norrgard, 1987–1989
 Gregory Spenner, 1989–1993
 Phillip Tyrrell, 1993–2003
 Gene Maddox, 2003–2007
 Dan Clute, 2007–2009
 Chris Hagenow, 2009–2013
 Bob Kressig, 2013–present

References

059